James Bert Sniadecki (born March 23, 1947) is a former professional American football linebacker in the National Football League. He played five seasons for the San Francisco 49ers.  He finished his playing career with The Hawaiians of the rival World Football League in 1975.

References

1947 births
Living people
Players of American football from South Bend, Indiana
American football linebackers
Indiana Hoosiers football players
San Francisco 49ers players